The following is a timeline of the history of the municipality of Maastricht, Netherlands.

Roman Period 

 circa 10 BC - Construction of Roman main road from Cologne to the coast.
 1st half of 1st century AD -  built; gradual development of settlement on both sides of the river Meuse.
 ca. 150 - Construction of Roman baths and walled sanctuary (with a 9-meter sculpted Jupiter column).
 ca. 270 - Destruction of Roman Maastricht by invading Germanic tribes.
 333 - Roman  (fortress) built.
 384 - Death of Saint Servatius in Maastricht (traditional); establishment of Roman Catholic Diocese of Maastricht (uncertain; this may have happened in the 6th c. only).

Middle Ages 
 ca. 570 - Bishop Monulph builds a large stone church on the grave of Saint Servatius.
 ca. 590-670 - At least twelve royal mint masters active in Maastricht.
 595 - Childebert II in Maastricht.
 667-670 - Childeric II in Maastricht. 
 690-695 - Clovis IV in Maastricht.
 ca. 700 - Murder of Lambert of Maastricht.
 720 - Seat of the Maastricht diocese moved to Liège (traditional date; this may have happened later in the 8th/9th c.).
 late 8th/early 9th c. - Alcuin and Einhard (lay) abbots of Saint Servatius.
 881 -  by Vikings.
 1001 - Reburial of Charles, Duke of Lower Lorraine in the crypt of the church of Saint Servatius.
 11th/12th c. -  at its apogee; at least five successive  provosts were chancellors of the Holy Roman Empire; collegiate churches of Saint Servatius and Our Lady renewed. 
 1204 -  by Hugues de Pierrepont, prince-bishop of Liège, and Louis II, Count of Loon;  established between Liège and Brabant.
 1229 - Duke of Brabant gives permission to replace the (partly?) earthen defence works by a stone city wall.
 1230 - Order of St Mary Magdalene ("white nuns") establish monastery in Maastricht (until 1796).
 1234 - Franciscans establish a monastery in Maastricht (throughout the ages around  existed in Maastricht, including Third Order monasteries).
 ca. 1240 - Hospital Brothers of St. Anthony establish monastery ('commandry') in Maastricht (until 1783).
 ca. 1250 - Dominicans and Augustinians establish monasteries in Maastricht (until 1796).
 1251 - First mention of  beguinage, later turned into several monasteries of Third Order Franciscan nuns and friars.
 1275 - Roman bridge collapses during a procession; many drowned.
 1280-98 - Sint Servaasbrug (bridge) built.
 1282 - Teutonic Order establish a commandry in Maastricht (until 1796).
 mid-14th century - second Medieval city wall built, enlarging the city surface by 400%.
 1391 - First recorded instance of the seven-yearly Pilgrimage of the Relics.
 1407/08 -  by Liège rebels.
 1438 - Crosier Monastery, Maastricht established (until 1796)
 ca. 1470 - Dinghuis courthouse built.
 1476 -  established, monastery of Third Order Franciscan nuns.

16th–18th century 
 1535 - Fifteen anabaptists burned in Vrijthof.
 1551 - Jacob Bathen starts printing and publishing business.
 1566 - Beeldenstorm in Maastricht; several churches looted by fanatic Protestants.
 1570 - Jesuits establish a monastery and a college (1575).
 1576 -  by Spanish troops and German mercenaries.
 1579 - Siege of Maastricht (1579) by Spanish forces, followed by three-day sack; all Protestants killed or expelled.
 1632 - Capture of Maastricht by Dutch forces; equal rights for Protestants and Catholics; several churches ceded to Protestants.
 1638 - : 22 traitors accused of helping the Spanish in recapturing the city; nine are executed.
 1662 - Municipal library founded.
 1673 - Siege of Maastricht (1673) by French forces.
 1678 - Peace of Nijmegen: French vacate the city; Dutch in power.
 1683 - Maastricht City Hall completed, designed by Pieter Post. Sint Servaasbrug (bridge) partly re-built.
 1748 - Siege of Maastricht (1748) by French forces; occupation lasted only a few months. Large scale model of the city and its fortifications built by the French (now in the Palais des Beaux-Arts de Lille).
 1789 -  theatre opens.
 1793 - Siege of Maastricht (1793) by French forces (failed).
 1794 -  by French forces.
 1795 - Maastricht becomes capital of the French Meuse-Inférieure département as part of the French First Republic, later First French Empire (until 1814).
Many art treasures, libraries and archives destroyed or looted.

19th century
 1805 -  (now a theater) built in Vrijthof.
 1811 -  established (including ).
 1815 - Maastricht becomes capital of the Province of Limburg, as part of the United Kingdom of the Netherlands.
 1822 - Société des Amis des Sciences, Lettres et Arts founded (precursor of Limburg Historical and Antiquarian Society; see 1929).
 1824 - Population: 20,271.
 1826 - Zuid-Willemsvaart (canal), including  (port) opened.
 1834 -  manufacturer of glass and pottery in business.
 1837 -  in use.
 1838 -  demolished.
 1840 -  built.
 1850 -  dug, parallel to Meuse. Many buildings on the riverside demolished, including 
 1851 -  French-language newspaper begins publication.
 1853 -  begins operating.
 1859 -  rebuilt.
 1861 - Liège–Maastricht railway begins operating.
 1863 -  manufactory in business.
 1865 - Maastricht–Venlo railway begins operating.
 1866 - Population: 28,495.
 1867 - Maastricht taken off list of fortified cities. Medieval city wall and ring of outer fortifications largely dismantled between 1867 and circa 1920.
 1877 - Population: 29,083.
 1881 - Limburg State Archives headquartered in former .
 1884 - Bonnefantenmuseum established (as a museum of archaeology and local history).
 1886 - Courrier du Limbourg newspaper begins publication.

20th century
 1902 - MVV Maastricht football club formed.
 1904 - Population: 36,146.
 1912 - Maastricht Natural History Museum founded.
 1915 - Maastricht railway station opens (current station; it had several predecessors).
 1916 - Saint Lambert Church built in Neo-Byzantine style.
 1919 - Population: 41,305.
 1920 - Annexation of Sint Pieter and Oud-Vroenhoven, as well as parts of Borgharen, Meerssen, Amby, Heer and Gronsveld. The area of the municipality of Maastricht increases from 4.15 km2 to 35 km2. Its population increases to 54,268.
 1926 - Eerste Nederlandse Cement Industrie factory begins operating; large section of Mount Saint Peter becomes limestone quarry.
 1929 -  established.
 1932 -  built.
 1935 - Juliana Canal opened.

 1940, 10 May - Battle of Maastricht; German occupation begins.
 1942 - Most of Maastricht's more than 500 Jews deported and killed in German concentration and extermination camps.
 1944, 13/14 September - : US troops of 30th Infantry Division ("Old Hickory") liberate the city.
 1944/45 - Maastricht serves as 'rest center' for allied forces. Maastricht Aachen Airport begins operating.
 1944, 7 December - Maastricht Meeting. Allied commanders Omar Bradley, Arthur Tedder, Dwight Eisenhower, Bernard Montgomery and William Hood Simpson meet in Maastricht to discuss further strategy.
 1948 - Jan Van Eyck Academie established.
 1950 - Maastricht Academy of Dramatic Arts established.
 1959 - Maastricht Institute of Arts active.
 1960 - Population: 90,202.
 1961 - De Geusselt stadium built.
 1962 - Maastricht Academy of Music established.
 1968 -  opens.
 1970 - Annexation of Borgharen, Itteren, Amby and Heer, as well as parts of Meerssen, Bemelen and Gronsveld. The area of the municipality of Maastricht increases from 35 km2 to 59 km2 and its population from 93,500 to 112,500.
 1973 - Museum aan het Vrijthof established.
 1975 - The European Fine Art Fair (TEFAF) starts as Pictura Fine Art Fair in Eurohal Exhibition Centre.
 1976 - Maastricht University opens.
 1981 - First European Council in Maastricht.
 1987 - Maastricht Randwyck railway station and Lumiere Cinema open.
 1988 - TEFAF moves to MECC Maastricht;  (Roman excavation site) opens.
 1990 - Population: 117,008.
 1991 - Academic Hospital Maastricht opens. 9/10 December: Second European Council in Maastricht.
 1992 - 7 February: Maastricht Treaty signed in city;  opens.
 1995 - Bonnefantenmuseum moves to new building by Aldo Rossi in  district.
 1999 -  (library and arts centre) opens.

21st century
 2002 - Gerd Leers becomes mayor;  officially adopted as the city's anthem.
 2003 - Hoge Brug (pedestrian bridge) opens.
 2005 -  (HCL) created through merger of national and city archives.
 2006 -  shopping mall rebuilt; Bookshop in adjacent .
 2010 - Onno Hoes becomes first openly gay mayor of Maastricht.
 2013 - Maastricht Noord railway station opens.
 2014 - Population: 121,906 municipality; 182,721 metro.
 2015 - Annemarie Penn-te Strake becomes first female mayor of Maastricht.
 2016 -  officially opened.

See also
 Maastricht history
 
 List of mayors of Maastricht
 
 Other names of Maastricht
 Timelines of other municipalities in the Netherlands: Amsterdam, Breda, Delft, Eindhoven, Groningen, Haarlem, The Hague, 's-Hertogenbosch, Leiden, Nijmegen, Rotterdam, Utrecht

References

This article incorporates information from the Dutch Wikipedia.

Bibliography

in English 

published in the 18th-19th century
 
 
 
 
 
published in the 20th century
 
 
 
 
published in the 21st century

in other languages

External links

 Europeana. Items related to Maastricht, various dates.
 Digital Public Library of America. Items related to Maastricht, various dates

 
Maastricht
Years in the Netherlands